Dramatic Chipmunk is a viral Internet video. The video is a 5-second clip of a prairie dog (erroneously referred to as a chipmunk) turning its head while the camera zooms in and dramatic music is played.

Origins 
The clip became widely known through uploads on YouTube and CollegeHumor on June 19, 2007.  An earlier and identical version, titled as Dramatic Look, had been uploaded to YouTube on June 6, 2007.

The clip of the prairie dog is from the Japanese television show Hello! Morning featuring Mini-Moni's segment, Mini-Moni Chiccha.  The clip has a prairie dog inside a transparent box being shown to the hosts in the studio. CollegeHumor also released a longer clip under the title Undramatic Chipmunk, showing how the video looked in the original Japanese version.

The audio used in Dramatic Chipmunk is taken from the score of the 1974 Mel Brooks film Young Frankenstein, which was composed by two-time Oscar nominee (and longtime Brooks collaborator) John Morris, and orchestrated by Morris and EGOT recipient Jonathan Tunick. It uses three dramatic chords (A minor, C minor, and E minor) performed in full orchestral tutti, and has a rumble of kettledrums in the background. The "chipmunk" turns its head and stares at the camera with a "surprised" look while the music is played.

Popularity 
Since its release, the video has received over fifty million views. People Magazine named the Dramatic Chipmunk as one of The 10 Wildest YouTube Stars of 2007.

Since 2013, the Minnesota Golden Gophers have been known to play the Dramatic Chipmunk video on the Jumbotron during home football games to distract opposing kickers.

In the video game Overwatch, the Wrecking Ball character – an enhanced-intelligent hamster that pilots a mecha – was given a highlight introduction in April 2019 that spoofs the Dramatic Chipmunk meme.

Notes

References 

Individual rodents
Viral videos
Internet humor
Animals on the Internet
Prairie dogs
2007 YouTube videos
Internet memes introduced in 2007
Film and television memes

Audio